Fish Canyon Falls is a tiered waterfall in Los Angeles County, California, located within the Angeles National Forest in the San Gabriel Mountains.

Unlike many seasonal waterfalls in Southern California, it has a fairly reliable flow year round, due to springs located further up the canyon. However, it can still dry up during the late summers of dry years. 

A  round trip hike provides access to the falls. Prior to 2014, the falls were very difficult to reach due to the private Vulcan Materials quarry in the mouth of Fish Canyon, which required a long and exposed bypass hike over the neighboring ridge. In the summer of 2014 a new trail opened through the quarry allowing hikers a much easier path to the falls.

2016 Complex Fire 

The Fish Canyon Trail and Fish Canyon Falls were involved in the 2016 Complex Fire, with 95% of the trail falling within the burn area. A small percentage of the trail is on private corporate property (Vulcan Mining / Materials) and a small percentage of the trail is administered by the United States Forest Service however most of the property falls under the administration of the City of Duarte. 

A survey of the damage by the City of Duarte, the U. S. Forest Service, and the San Gabriel Mountains Trailbuilders along with other representatives from various agencies was conducted, and the assessment was that the damage was heavy enough to warrant the closure of the hiking trail with no recommendation for efforts to repair the historic trail. Ultimately the City of Duarte holds the primary decision on whether to repair the damaged trail resulting from the Complex Fire however as of September 2018, the assessment is that the trail is defunct and will not be repaired.

See also
List of waterfalls of California

External links
Fish Canyon Falls at World of Waterfalls
Fish Canyon Falls Hike at Modern Hiker

Waterfalls of California